Nagi Daifullah (1949 – August, 1973; Arabic: ناجي ضيف الله ) was a Yemeni migrant to the United States and union organizer with the United Farm Workers. He was a strike captain during the 1973 grape farmers' strike organized by Cesar Chavez. Daifullah spoke Arabic, English, and Spanish, and was integral in not only organizing the Yemeni community but also transcending ethnic and linguistic barriers between workers. One report by the United Farm Workers Organizing Committee comments on Daifullah's importance as a strike leader:

Death

Daifullah was killed in August 1973 at the age of 24 by Kern County police when one officer beat him in the head with his flashlight and then dragged him so that his head continued hitting the pavement. Over 7,000 people attended Daifullah's funeral. A display features prominently in the Arab American Museum at Dearborn, Michigan, and the Orange County Democratic group has issued a Social Justice Award in Daifullah's name. Yemeni, Nicaraguan, and Chinese janitorial workers in California who were struggling to organize with the Service Employees International Union (SEIU) drew on Nagi Daifalluh's legacy during their campaign. Daifalluh was one of the most important Arab trade unionists in the United States.

References

Farmworkers
Yemeni emigrants to the United States
1949 births
1973 deaths
Deaths by beating in the United States
Police brutality in the United States
People murdered in California
United Farm Workers
Trade unionists from California